Gallaway is a surname. Notable people with the surname include:

Garth Gallaway, sports commentator
Iain Gallaway, sports commentator
Roger Gallaway, Canadian educator and politician
Sam Gallaway (born 1992), Australian soccer player
Walter H. Gallaway (1870–1911), artist